Abdallah ibn Yasin (died 7 July 1059 C.E. in "Krifla" near Rommani, present-day Morocco) was a theologian and spiritual leader of the Almoravid movement.

Early life, education and career
Abdallah ibn Yasin was from the tribe of the Jazulah (pronounced Guezula), a Sanhaja sub-tribe from the Sous. A Maliki theologian, he was a disciple of Waggag ibn Zallu al-Lamti and studied in his Ribat, "Dar al-Murabitin" which was located in the village of Aglu, near present-day Tiznit. In 1046 the Gudala chief Yahya Ibn Ibrahim, came to the Ribat asking for someone to promulgate Islamic religious teachings amongst the Berber of the Adrar (present-day Mauritania) and Waggag ibn Zallu chose to send Abdallah ibn Yasin with him. The Sanhaja were at this stage only superficially Islamicised and still clung to many heathen practices, and so Ibn Yasin preached to them an orthodox Sunnism.

After a revolt of the Godala he was forced to withdraw with his followers. In alliance with Yahya ibn Umar, the leader of the Lamtuna tribe, he managed to quell the rebellion.

Ibn Yasin now formed the Almoravid alliance from the tribes of the Lamtuna, the Masufa and the Godala, with himself as spiritual leader and Yahya ibn Umar taking the military command. In 1054 the Maghrawa-ruled Sijilmasa was conquered. Ibn Yasin introduced his orthodox rule - amongst other things wine and music were forbidden, non-Islamic taxes were abolished and one fifth of the spoils of war were allocated to the religious experts. This rigorous application of Islam soon provoked a revolt in 1055.

Death
Yahya ibn Umar was killed in 1056 in a renewed revolt of the Gudala in the Sahara, upon which Ibn Yasin appointed Yahya's brother Abu-Bakr Ibn-Umar (1056–1087) the new military leader. Abu Bakr destroyed Sijilmasa, but was not able to force the Gudala back into the Almoravid league. He went on to capture Sūs and its capital Aghmat (near modern Marrakech) in 1058.

Ibn Yasin died while attempting to subjugate the Barghawata on the Atlantic coast in 1059. He was replaced by Sulaiman ibn Haddu, who, killed in turn, would not be replaced. His grave is almost due south of Rabat, near Rommani, overlooking the Krifla River, and is marked on Michelin maps as the marabout of Sidi Abdallah. A mosque and a mausoleum were built on his grave, and the site is still intact today.

See also
Almoravid dynasty
Waggag ibn Zallu al-Lamti

References

Further reading
Norris, H.T.  1971. New evidence on the life of ‘Abdullah B. Yasin and the origins of the Almoravid movement. The Journal of African History, Vol. 12, No. 2 (1971), pp. 255–268.
  

1059 deaths
11th-century Berber people
Scholars under the Almoravid dynasty
Berber scholars
Muslim missionaries
11th-century Muslim scholars of Islam
People from Akka, Morocco
Sanhaja
Year of birth missing